Yucheng may refer to:

Places in China

Yucheng, Shandong (禹城市), county-level city of Dezhou
Yucheng County (虞城县), Shangqiu, Henan
Yucheng District (雨城区), Ya'an, Sichuan
Yucheng, Yutai County (鱼城镇), town in Yutai County, Shandong
Yucheng, Zibo (域城镇), town in Boshan District, Zibo, Shandong
Yucheng, Haiyan County, Zhejiang (于城镇), town in Haiyan County, Zhejiang

Other uses
 Yujiulü Yucheng (reigned 464–485), ruler of the Rouran